Asbury Park Public Schools is a comprehensive community public school district headquartered in Asbury Park, New Jersey, United States, serving children in pre-Kindergarten through twelfth grade. The district is one of 31 former Abbott districts statewide that were established pursuant to the decision by the New Jersey Supreme Court in Abbott v. Burke which are now referred to as "SDA Districts" based on the requirement for the state to cover all costs for school building and renovation projects in these districts under the supervision of the New Jersey Schools Development Authority.
Students from Allenhurst and Interlaken attend the district's schools as part of a sending/receiving relationship. 

As of the 2020–21 school year, the district, comprised of four schools, had an enrollment of 1,771 students and 175.0 classroom teachers (on an FTE basis), for a student–teacher ratio of 10.1:1.

The district is classified by the New Jersey Department of Education as being in District Factor Group "A", the lowest of eight groupings. District Factor Groups organize districts statewide to allow comparison by common socioeconomic characteristics of the local districts. From lowest socioeconomic status to highest, the categories are A, B, CD, DE, FG, GH, I and J.

History
In March 2011, the state monitor overseeing the district's finances ordered that Barack Obama Elementary School be closed after the end of the 2010–11 school year, citing a 35% decline in enrollment in the district during the prior 10 years. Students then attending the school would be reallocated to the district's two other elementary schools, with those going into fifth grade assigned to attend middle school. In 2014, the Barack Obama Elementary School reopened, and Asbury Park Middle School reverted to serving students only from grade 6–8.

In July 2014, the New Jersey Department of Education approved a request by Interlaken under which it would end its sending relationship with the Asbury Park district and begin sending its students to the West Long Branch Public Schools through eighth grade and then onto Shore Regional High School. 

Students from Deal had attended the district's high school as part of a sending/receiving relationship that was terminated after the Deal district filed in petition in 2016 and after it was approved was replaced with an agreement with Shore Regional.

With an annual cut in aid of $3.4 million for the 2019-20 school year and more on the way for subsequent years, the district was considering a reconfiguration of the district under which Obama Elementary School would be closed, the two remaining elementary schools would serve PreK-3, the middle school would serve grades 4-6 and the high school would cover grades 7-12. The district, which was spending a total cost per pupil of $42,382 in 2017–18, was the subject of an audit in 2019 which found that the district had a capacity to serve 3,095, but an enrollment of 1,862 in 2017–18, a decline from 2,132 nearly a decade earlier. A 2019 audit

Schools
Schools in the district (with 2020–21 enrollment data from the National Center for Education Statistics) are:
Elementary schools
Bradley Elementary School with 301 students in grades PreK-5
Thea Jackson, Principal
Thurgood Marshall Elementary School with 247 students in grades PreK-5
Dr. Lauren Schulze, Principal
Middle school
Dr. Martin Luther King Jr. Upper Elementary School with 370 students in grades 6-8
Perry Medina, Principal
High school
Asbury Park High School with 682 students in grades 9-12
Bridget O'Neill, Principal

Administration
Core members of the district's administration are:
Dr. Rashawn M. Adams, Superintendent
Geoffrey Hastings, Business Administrator / Board Secretary
Carol Morris, State Monitor

In 2014, interim superintendent Robert Mahon resigned, expressing his frustration with the direction of the district after the board of education had been unable to hire a permanent superintendent; he was one of four superintendents that the district had gone through in a six-year period. Gregory Allen was chosen in July 2014 to succeed Mahon as interim superintendent at that time. Lamont Repollet served as superintendent from October 2014 to January 2018, when he was named to serve as commissioner of the New Jersey Department of Education.

Board of education
The district's board of education is comprised of nine members who set policy and oversee the fiscal and educational operation of the district through its administration. As a Type II school district, the board's trustees are elected directly by voters to serve three-year terms of office on a staggered basis, with three seats up for election each year held (since 2012) as part of the November general election. The board appoints a superintendent to oversee the district's day-to-day operations and a business administrator to supervise the business functions of the district.

References

External links
Asbury Park Public Schools
 
School Data for the Asbury Park Public Schools, National Center for Education Statistics

Asbury Park, New Jersey
New Jersey Abbott Districts
New Jersey District Factor Group A
School districts in Monmouth County, New Jersey